Dartington is a village in Devon, England. Its population is 876. The electoral ward of Dartington includes the surrounding area and had a population of 1,753 at the 2011 census.  It is located west of the River Dart, south of Dartington Hall and about two miles (3 km) north-west of Totnes.  Dartington is home to an obsolete cider press (now the centrepiece of a shopping centre named after it), the Cott Inn, a public house dating from 1320, and Dartington Hall.

Education
Dartington International Summer School of music, every summer since 1953
Dartington College of Arts, which was founded in 1961 and moved to Falmouth in 2008
Dartington Hall School, a private school located at Dartington Hall between 1926 until it closed in 1987
Schumacher College
Dartington Primary School, a state Church of England school.
Bidwell Brook School

Notable people
 Robert Froude (1771–1859), Rector of Denbury and of Dartington from 1799 to his death
 Hurrell Froude (1803–1836), Anglican priest and an early leader of the Oxford Movement.
 William Froude (1810–1879), an English engineer, hydrodynamicist and naval architect. 
 James Anthony Froude FRSE (1818–1894), an English historian, novelist, biographer and editor of Fraser's Magazine. 
 Leonard Knight Elmhirst FRSA (1893–1974), philanthropist and agronomist, co-founded the Dartington Hall project. 
 David Gawen Champernowne (1912–2000), economist and mathematician, family seat at Dartington Hall.

References

External links
The Dartington Hall Trust
Dartington Parish Council
Devon County Council's page on Dartington
The Social Research Unit at Dartington
Dartington in 1868
Bidwell Brook School

Civil parishes in South Hams
Villages in South Hams